"A Double Buggy at Lahey's Creek" is a short story by Australian writer and poet Henry Lawson, first published in 1901. It was Lawson's second story to include the character of Joe Wilson; however, chronologically, it is fourth and final in the Joe Wilson series. The story recounts the events that befall Joe Wilson and his family, and which ultimately lead to his buying a double buggy for his wife, Mary.

Plot summary

The story begins with Joe's earlier, unsuccessful attempts to acquire a double buggy, and how Mary's suggestion to grow potatoes becomes a profitable venture. Following a string of good luck, Joe decides to buy a double buggy for Mary, to show his appreciation for all the sacrifices she has made over the years of their marriage. The surprise gift strengthens what had been a somewhat unstable marriage.

Publication
Lawson finished writing "A Double Buggy at Lahey's Creek" in August 1900. It was first published in Blackwood's Magazine in February 1901, and again that same year in the short story collection Joe Wilson and His Mates.

Characters
Joe Wilson
Narrator of the story. He is a typical Australian "battler," and experiences the ups and downs of late nineteenth century living. He cares greatly for his wife, though her opinion counts for little when it comes to making a living. He considers himself quite resourceful.
Mary Wilson
Joe Wilson's wife. She is quite an intelligent woman, and likes to have her opinion heard, to the point that Joe considers her to be obstinate. She rarely complains about her dull, lonely lifestyle.
Jim Wilson
The only child of Joe and Mary. His real name is John Henry Wilson, after an uncle godfather, but they'd called him Jim "from the first (and before it)." Though Jim plays a larger part in other Joe Wilson stories, particularly "Brighten's Sister-in-law," his role in this story is only marginal.
James Black
Mary's "young scamp of a brother." He keeps Mary and the family company when Joe is on the road. He helps out around the property.
Bill and Robert Galletly
Two brothers, the "biggest men in the district," who own a coach shop. They offer Joe a double buggy that he can pay off over time, whenever he can.

References

Short stories by Henry Lawson
1901 short stories